Ballistik Boyz from Exile Tribe (Japanese: バリスティック ボーイズ・フロム・エグザイル・トライブ, stylized as BALLISTIK BOYZ from EXILE TRIBE and formerly known as Ballistik Boyz) is a seven-member Japanese male dance, vocal and MC unit formed and managed by LDH. The group is part of the collective Exile Tribe, related to Exile, and signed to the record label Rhythm Zone from the Avex Group .

The group was formed in a collaboration of Hiro and Doberman Infinity during Vocal Battle Audition 5.

They are the first group in Exile Tribe where all members are holding microphones to sing and rap while dancing.

Ballistik Boyz debuted with their self-titled first album, Ballistik Boyz, on May 22, 2019.

History

2018 : Formation and Pre-debut 
In April 2018, Exile Hiro and Doberman Infinity decided to produce a new group by choosing 4 finalists from "Vocal Battle Audition 5", Ryusei Kainuma and Riki Matsui from the rap division and Ryuta Hidaka and Yoshiyuki Kanou from the vocal division, plus three members of Project TARO who were the winners of 2014's "Global Japan Challenge", Miku Fukahori, Rikiya Okuda, and Masahiro Sunada.

On May 1, 2018, the group's formation was announced on TBS TV show .

Starting May 12, the group participated as the opening act of Fantastics nation-wide small-scale tour, the so called, Musha shugyō,"FANTASTICS yume-sha shugyō FANTASTIC 9". They were also performing as opening act of Dance Earth Party's 3-day festival Dance Earth Festival 2018 ~Splash Summer~ on July 14, 15 and 16, 2018.

2019: Major Debut and Battle of Tokyo 
From March 2 to 31, 2019, Ballistik Boyz launched their own nation-wide small-scale Musha shugyō tour.

On March 31, it was announced that the group would make their major-label debut on May 22 with a self-titled album. On the same day, the group released their first official music video for the song "Tenhane 1000%", which was filmed in Los Angeles.

In June 2019, LDH's multimedia project "Battle of Tokyo", which includes all Jr.Exile groups, started. During this month those 4 groups released collaboration singles every week, until they released a full album titled "Battle Of Tokyo 〜Enter The Jr.Exile〜" on July 3, 2019. Accompanying the album release, the groups held a row of live performances from July 4 to 7 with the same name.

On August 28 it was announced that Ballistik Boyz would release their first single "44Raiders" on October 23 accompanied by a row of release-events. In September, the group held performances in Malaysia and Taiwan and announced they would also perform in Indonesia, Thailand and Vietnam in near future. On October 1, they released the music video for the title track of their new single and launched their own YouTube channel at the same time.

2020: Additional singles and Live×Online 
After performing in different countries across Asia, it was announced that the group would release their second single "Anti-Hero's" on February 12, 2020, as the kickoff single for their first national tour Ballistik Boyz Live Tour 2020 "BBZ" , which would take place from February 14 to April 25, 2020. The lead song “Anti-Hero's” of the second single includes a message from the life of Ballistik Boyz about pursuing what you truly believe: 'If you believe in yourself and fight without fear, you will truly shine.' Furthermore, all songs from the single were be pre-delivered for digital streaming in a weekly manner starting with "Anti-Hero's" on January 22, followed by "Front Burner" on January 29, "Bang Out" on February 5 and "Strangers" on February 12.

On June 10, it was announced that due to COVID-19 pandemic, all remaining concerts were cancelled, therefore the tour finishing on February 22. On August 3, the group revealed their new digital single "Summer Hype" to be released on August 10. In compensation of the suspension of their tour, the group held a series of livestreamed concerts on the Japanese streaming platform AbemaTV from September to December. Their first livestreamed concert LIVE×ONLINE IMAGINATION Ballistik Boyz was held on September 20, and on October 30, they took part in livestreamed joint concert Live×Online Iinfinity "Halloween" Trick or Treat!! R.F.B.Halloween Party!!. On December 23, they held another livestreamed concert LIVE×ONLINE BEYOND THE BORDER BALLISTIK BOYZ. On December 31, the group took part in the livestreamed concert of LDH artists, LIVE×ONLINE COUNTDOWN 2020▶2021"Rising Sun to the World".

2021: Pass The Mic 
On January 1, 2021, the group released their new single Animal on February 3. On February 17, it was announced that they would hold their second national tour Ballistik Boyz Prologue Live Tour 2021 "Pass The Mic" ～Way To The Glory～ in March and April.

On April 18, a new album by Jr.Exile for the Battle of Tokyo project titled "Battle of Tokyo Time 4 Jr.Exile" was announced to be released on June 23, the songs by the individual groups and the collaboration song of Generations & The Rampage were pre-released digitally from April 19 to June 21, the music videos were released in a hybrid live-action/animated form, with this latter featuring the four groups' avatars. Moreover, the DVD Version included the concert video of "Battle Of Tokyo ~Enter The Jr.Exile~" held in Makuhari Messe in July 2019.

On August 4, they released their fourth single "Sum Baby".

On November 24, Ballistik Boyz released their second album "Pass The Mic", it includes all their singles since their debut plus the album's promotional track "All Around The World" with a total of 18 songs.

On December 8, the group released the tribute single "Ballistik Boyz from Exile" as a part of Exile's 20th anniversary celebration project "Exile Tribute", the single is the second of the four consecutive tribute singles releases by Jr.Exile groups.

Members

Discography

Studio albums

Singles

Participating works

Live

As lead artists

As a participating group

Livestreamed Concerts 
Headlining

LIVE×ONLINE IMAGINATION BALLISTIK BOYZ(September 20, 2020)

LIVE×ONLINE BEYOND THE BORDER BALLISTIK BOYZ(December 23, 2020)

Joint

LIVE×ONLINE INFINITY "HALLOWEEN" Trick or Treat!! R.F.B.Halloween Party!!.(October 30, 2020)

LIVE×ONLINE COUNTDOWN 2020▶2021"Rising Sun to the World" .(December 31, 2020)

Tie-up

Filmography

TV Shows

Awards

Notes

References

External links 

 BALLISTIK BOYZ - Official site
 BALLISTIK BOYZ (@ballistik_fext) - Twitter

2019 establishments in Japan
Avex Group artists
Japanese boy bands
Japanese dance music groups
Japanese musical groups
Japanese hip hop groups
Musical groups established in 2019
LDH (company) artists